Cedrick Mabwati Gerard  (born 8 March 1992), known simply as Cedrick, is a Congolese professional footballer who plays for Spanish club Marbella FC as a left winger.

Club career
Born in Kinshasa, Cedrick arrived in Spain in his early teens, moving with his family from the Democratic Republic of the Congo and joining Atlético Madrid's youth system at the age of 13. He made his senior debut only three years later, going on to spend two full seasons with the reserves in the Segunda División B.

On 6 January 2010, not yet aged 18, Cedrick made his first-team debut with the Colchoneros, against Recreativo de Huelva in the round of 16 of Copa del Rey: after committing a penalty in the early minutes of the game, he was replaced shortly after by manager Quique Sánchez Flores in an eventual 3–0 away loss (5–4 aggregate win). In the ensuing summer, he was loaned to Segunda División club CD Numancia in a season-long move.

Cedrick was first choice during his three-year spell in Soria, scoring nine goals in his first season. On 10 June 2013, he bought out his contract with Numancia for a mere €1,20 and signed with Real Betis. He made his La Liga debut on 18 August by starting in a 2–1 defeat at Real Madrid, and totalled 1,129 minutes of action in 12 starts as the Andalusians were relegated.

On 28 August 2014, Cedrick was loaned to CA Osasuna also in division two. On 30 January of the following year, he signed for Major League Soccer's Columbus Crew, but remained on loan to the Navarrese until the end of the campaign.

Cedrick returned to Spain and its second tier on 27 December 2016, after agreeing to a six-month deal with UCAM Murcia CF. He remained in the country the following years after recovering from a serious knee injury, representing in quick succession Internacional de Madrid, CD Tudelano and Real Avilés CF.

International career
Aged only 17, Cedrick started appearing with the DR Congo under-20s. He made his debut for the full team on 6 September 2014, starting in a 2–0 home loss against Cameroon in the 2015 Africa Cup of Nations qualifying phase.

Cedrick played all six matches in the final stages in Equatorial Guinea, helping his country to the third place. In the last, against the hosts, he converted his penalty shoot-out attempt in a 4–2 win.

Honours
Columbus Crew
Eastern Conference: 2015

DR Congo
Africa Cup of Nations third place: 2015

References

External links

1992 births
Living people
21st-century Democratic Republic of the Congo people
Democratic Republic of the Congo footballers
Footballers from Kinshasa
Association football wingers
La Liga players
Segunda División players
Segunda División B players
Tercera División players
Segunda Federación players
Tercera Federación players
Atlético Madrid B players
Atlético Madrid footballers
CD Numancia players
Real Betis players
CA Osasuna players
UCAM Murcia CF players
Internacional de Madrid players
CD Tudelano footballers
Real Avilés CF footballers
Marbella FC players
Major League Soccer players
Columbus Crew players
Democratic Republic of the Congo international footballers
2015 Africa Cup of Nations players
Democratic Republic of the Congo expatriate footballers
Expatriate footballers in Spain
Expatriate soccer players in the United States
Democratic Republic of the Congo expatriate sportspeople in Spain